Dying for It is the second extended play by Scottish indie pop group The Vaselines, released in March 1988. The EP was later included on their career retrospective collection The Way of the Vaselines: A Complete History. The song "Teenage Superstars" was later included as the fourth track on their debut album Dum-Dum in 1989. The song "Molly's Lips" is named in tribute to the well-known Scottish television personality Molly Weir.

Alternative rock figurehead Kurt Cobain listed the Dying for It EP as his fourth favorite 'album' ever. His band Nirvana covered "Molly's Lips", as well as a song from the earlier Vaselines EP, on their 1992 compilation Incesticide. Nirvana also performed the song "Jesus Doesn't Want Me for a Sunbeam" (original song name "Jesus Wants Me for a Sunbeam") for their MTV Unplugged in New York concert.

Track listing
All songs written by Kelly and McKee.

Side A
"Dying for It"
"Molly's Lips"

Side B
"Teenage Superstars"
"Jesus Wants Me for a Sunbeam"

Personnel
 Eugene Kelly — vocals, guitars
 Frances McKee — vocals, guitars
 James Seenan — bass
 Charlie Kelly — drums

Additional personnel
 David Keegan — lead guitar on "Dying for It"
 Sophie Pragnell — viola on "Jesus Wants Me for A Sunbeam" and "Dying for It"
 Stephen Pastel — producer
 Ian Beveridge and Peter Haigh — engineers

Charts

References

1988 EPs
The Vaselines albums